David William Murray, 3rd Earl of Mansfield, KT (7 March 1777 – 18 February 1840) was a British army officer and peer. Mansfield served as Lord Lieutenant of Clackmannanshire from 1803 until his death.

Family
David William Murray was born in Paris in 1777 to David Murray, then 7th Viscount Stormont, and Louisa, daughter of Charles Cathcart, 9th Lord Cathcart. In 1792 Murray's father succeeded to his uncle William Murray's 1792 creation of the Mansfield earldom; Murray himself succeeded in 1796, inheriting Kenwood House in Camden, London.

On 16 September 1797 Mansfield married Frederica, daughter of William Markham, Archbishop of York. They had nine children:
 Lady Frederica Louisa Murray (1800–1823), married James Hamilton Stanhope in 1823 and had issue
 Lady Elizabeth Anne Murray (born 1803), unmarried 
 Lady Caroline Murray (born 1805), unmarried 
 William David (1806–1898), who succeeded as 4th Earl of Mansfield and married Louisa, third daughter of Cutbbert Ellison, in 1829 and had issue
 Lady Georgina Catherine Murray (born 1807)
 Honourable Charles John Murray (born 1810), married Frances Elizabeth, second surviving daughter of Thomas Anson, 1st Viscount Anson in 1835
 Honourable David Henry Murray (born 1811), Captain in the Scots Fusilier Guards
 Lady Cecilia Sarah Murray (1814–1830)
 Lady Emily Murray (1816–1902), married Francis Seymour, later 5th Marquess of Hertford, in 1839 and had issue

Education and career

He received a degree, Doctor of Civil Law, from Christ Church, Oxford in 1793. He joined the Militia, becoming Colonel of the East Middlesex Militia in 1798, transferring to the Royal Perth Militia on 3 May 1803.

Mansfield served as Lord Lieutenant of Clackmannanshire from 1803 until his death.

In 1835 Mansfield was elected a Knight of the Order of the Thistle. He was also a Fellow of the Royal Society (elected 1802) and a Fellow of the Society of Antiquaries of London.

Mansfield died at Leamington on 18 February 1840 and is buried in St Andrew's Churchyard, Kingsbury, London.

References

External links
 

1777 births
1840 deaths
Alumni of Christ Church, Oxford
Middlesex Militia officers
British Militia officers
3
Knights of the Thistle
Lord-Lieutenants of Clackmannanshire
Fellows of the Society of Antiquaries of London
Fellows of the Royal Society
David William
Dunbar, David William Murray, 3rd Earl of